Tom Perry is a former Canadian politician. He served as an MLA in the Legislative Assembly of British Columbia from 1986 to 1996, as a member of the British Columbia New Democratic Party.
He qualified as a doctor.
Perry was first elected to the Legislative Assembly in a by-election in Vancouver-Point Grey in 1989, after Kim Campbell resigned from the legislature to run in the 1988 federal election. At the time, Vancouver-Point Grey was a multiple-member district, and Perry served alongside Darlene Marzari. In the 1991 election, which was contested under new single-member boundaries, Marzari was the NDP candidate in Vancouver-Point Grey, while Perry stood in Vancouver-Little Mountain, where he was re-elected. He was the minister for advanced education, training and technology from 1991 to 1993. He did not run in the 1996 election, and was succeeded by Gary Farrell-Collins.

He subsequently returned to medicine, teaching clinical pharmacology at Vancouver General Hospital and UBC Hospital.

References

British Columbia New Democratic Party MLAs
Physicians from British Columbia
Politicians from Vancouver
Living people
Members of the Executive Council of British Columbia
Year of birth missing (living people)